Senotainia rubriventris is a species of satellite flies (insects in the family Sarcophagidae).

Distribution
Canada, United States, Bahamas, Jamaica, Puerto Rico.

References

Sarcophagidae
Insects described in 1846
Diptera of North America